Recompense may refer to:

 Financial compensation,
 Recompense (film), a lost 1925 American drama film